Masuchi (written 増地), is a Japanese surname. Notable people with the surname include:

, Japanese judoka, wife of Katsuyuki
, Japanese judoka

See also
 Mabuchi Motor

Japanese-language surnames